Unorganized Kenora District is an unorganized area in northwestern Ontario, Canada, in Kenora District. Constituting 98.39 percent of the district's land area, yet only 10.93 percent of its population, it is essentially the remainder of the district's territory after all incorporated cities, municipalities, townships, Indian reserves, and Indian settlements have been excluded. It is by far the largest municipal-equivalent level census division in Ontario, covering over 35 percent of the entire provincial land area, yet only about 0.05 percent of the population of Ontario.

Local services boards
Greater Oxdrift
Melgund
Minaki
Red Lake Road
Redditt
Round Lake
Wabigoon

Demographics

Population trend:
 Population in 2011: 7,031
 Population in 2006: 7,041
 Population in 2001: 7,631
 Population in 1996: 10,269 (or 7,981 when adjusted to 2001 boundaries)
 Population in 1991: 9,723

See also
List of townships in Ontario
Sand Point Lake, Ontario

External links 
Presentation of Unorganized Kenora District - Statistics Canada

References

Geography of Kenora District
Kenora